Spikebuccinum is a genus of sea snails, marine gastropod mollusks in the family Buccinidae.

Species
Species within the genus Spikebuccinum include:

 Spikebuccinum stephaniae Harasewych & Kantor, 2004

References

External links

Buccinidae
Monotypic gastropod genera